The chapters of Japanese manga Inuyashiki are written and illustrated by Hiroya Oku.

Volume list

References

External links
  

Inuyashiki